Welsh Chileans are Chileans of Welsh descent whose family roots came from Wales. The Welsh did not settle in Chile. Generally, they were identified with the other British groups in Chile. About 30,000 residents of Chile have Welsh surnames.

Notable Welsh Chileans
George Edwards Brown (1780–1848), British doctor and businessman, founder of the family in Chile
Agustín Edwards Ossandón (1815–1878), businessman
Agustín Edwards Ross (1852–1897), businessman and politician, purchased the Valparaíso, Chile edition of El Mercurio newspaper in 1880
Agustín Edwards Mac Clure (1878–1941), businessman, diplomat and politician, President of the League of Nations and founder of the Santiago edition of El Mercurio newspaper
Raul Edwards Mac Clure (?–1927), businessman and politician
Joaquín Edwards Bello (1887–1968), writer and journalist
María Edwards Mac Clure (1893–1972), Righteous Among the Nations
Agustín Edwards Budge (1899–?), businessman
Agustín Edwards Eastman (1928–2017), businessman
Jorge Edwards Valdés (1931–2023) novelist, winner of the 1999 Cervantes Prize
Cristian Edwards del Río, businessman and kidnapping victim
Catalina Edwards, journalist, news presenter

See also
British Chilean

References

 
Welsh diaspora